{{Chembox

| ImageFile = Fluomine.svg
| ImageSize = 200px

| IUPACName = 
| OtherNames = {{bulleted list|Fluomine dust|Cobalt(II), N,''N-ethylenebis-(3-fluorosalicyclideneiminato)-|Cobalt, bis(3-fluorosalicylaldehyde)ethylenediimine-}}

| Section1 = 
| Section2 = 
| Section3 = 
}}Fluomine''' is a chemical compound containing a cobalt chelate. It has the ability to form a complex with molecular oxygen (O2) and then release it upon heating.  Because of this ability to reversibly sorb and desorb oxygen, it has been used in high-altitude aircraft oxygen-generating systems.

The toxicity of fluomine has been studied and it is classified by the Emergency Planning and Community Right-to-Know Act as an extremely hazardous substance.

References

Cobalt compounds
Fluoroarenes
Imines